Scelotes caffer, the Cape dwarf burrowing skink or Peters's burrowing skink, is a species of lizard which is endemic to South Africa.

References

caffer
Reptiles of South Africa
Reptiles described in 1861
Taxa named by Wilhelm Peters